Sergei Nikolayevich Varfolomeyev (born 27 February 1968 in Leningrad) is a former Russian football player.

He is the older brother of Dmitri Varfolomeyev.

External links
 

1968 births
Living people
FC Dynamo Saint Petersburg players
Soviet footballers
FC Zenit Saint Petersburg players
Russian footballers
Russian Premier League players
FC Saturn Ramenskoye players
Dinaburg FC players
Russian expatriate footballers
Expatriate footballers in Latvia
FC Kristall Smolensk players

Association football forwards